ISO 3166-2:GR is the entry for Greece in ISO 3166-2, part of the ISO 3166 standard published by the International Organization for Standardization (ISO) which defines codes for the names of the principal subdivisions (e.g., provinces or states) of all countries coded in ISO 3166-1.

Currently for Greece, ISO 3166-2 codes are defined for two categories of subdivisions:
 13 administrative regions
 1 self-governed part

The departments (also called prefectures) were abolished in 2011, and were replaced approximately by regional units. The regional units were deleted from the entry in 2016.

Each code consists of two parts, separated by a hyphen. The second part is either of the following:
 one letter (A–M): administrative regions
 two digits: self-governed part

Current codes
Subdivision names are listed as in the ISO 3166-2 standard published by the ISO 3166 Maintenance Agency (ISO 3166/MA).

Click on the button in the header to sort each column.

Administrative regions

 Notes

Self-governed part

Changes
The following changes to the entry have been announced in newsletters by the ISO 3166/MA since the first publication of ISO 3166-2 in 1998:

The following changes to the entry are listed on ISO's online catalogue, the Online Browsing Platform:

Codes changed in Newsletter II-1

Codes removed on 15 November 2016

See also
 Subdivisions of Greece
 FIPS region codes of Greece
 NUTS codes of Greece

External links
 ISO Online Browsing Platform: GR
 Departments of Greece, Statoids.com

2:GR
ISO 3166-2
ISO 3166-2
Greece geography-related lists